Edgars Eriņš (born 18 June 1986) is a Latvian decathlete and bobsledder.

He is the holder of the Latvian record in decathlon, which is 8312 points. Eriņš reached it in the 2011 Latvian Championships, which he won. He was qualified for 2011 World Championships in Daegu, South Korea and appeared on the entry list, but didn't compete due to injury.

He made his bobsleigh Europa Cup debut in November 2013 in a four-man race at Altenberg where his crew finished sixth. He made his first appearance in the Bobsleigh World Cup in the four-man event at St. Moritz in January 2014, where his sleigh scored an 18th place.

References

External links 
 
 
 
 
 

1986 births
Living people
Latvian decathletes
Athletes (track and field) at the 2012 Summer Olympics
Olympic athletes of Latvia
Latvian male bobsledders
21st-century Latvian people